Periclepsis accinctana is a species of moth of the family Tortricidae. It is found in North Africa, where it has been recorded from Tunisia and Morocco.

References

	

Archipini
Moths described in 1915
Moths of Africa
Taxa named by Pierre Chrétien